Join In! was a Canadian educational children's television show which aired on TVOntario between 1989 and 1995. It was created and produced by Jed MacKay, who also wrote all of the show's original songs.

It won the Alliance for Children and Television's Best Pre-school Program Award and was also a finalist three times for the Gemini Award for Best Pre-school Program.

Every program had a number of elements woven into the plot line that invited its audience to "Join In!"; in games, songs, puzzles, or stories. The cast also broke the fourth wall, talking to the camera, and thus the audience, as if they were right there on set. The songs broke away from the usual children's format, offering a wide variety of rhythm and styles. The cast also sang live on each show.

The first two seasons were directed by Doug Williams. The next four seasons were directed by Wayne Moss.

The cast was multi-racial, with two "minority" cast members.

The show was filmed in Lindsay, Ontario.

In the United States, Join In! aired on the Vision Interfaith Satellite Network from 1990 to 1993 and TLC's Ready Set Learn block from 1992 to 1995.

Characters 
The series revolved around three adults named Jacob Bennett, Nikki, and Zack, who shared a studio loft together. After the second season, Nikki moved away and was replaced by Kia.

In a typical episode, the three would be planning for some kind of play or production that would usually involve Nikki being in charge of music and sound, and Jacob and Zack would be in charge of the set, lighting, costumes, etc. when some form of problem would arise.

The show also featured a toy wizard named Winston, his wife Emmelina, and their dog Abra, who lived on a windowsill in the loft.

Cast
 Zack - Marty Brier
 Nikki - Pamela Sinha
 Jacob Bennett - Rudy Webb
 Kia - Mishu Vellani
 Winston (voice) - Rob Cowan
 Emmelina (voice) - Maxine Miller
 Abra (voice) - Billy Van

Crew
 Producer - Jed MacKay
 Directors - Wayne Moss, Doug Williams
 Composer - Jed MacKay
 Music Director - Bruce Ley

References

External links
 Join In! on the Internet Movie Database

TVO original programming
1989 Canadian television series debuts
1995 Canadian television series endings
1980s Canadian children's television series
1990s Canadian children's television series
Canadian preschool education television series
Canadian television shows featuring puppetry